Endriartono Sutarto (born April 29, 1947) is a retired army general. He was the commander of the Indonesian National Armed Forces between 2002 and 2006.

Before assuming the highest helm at the military, Endriartono has served some key positions in the Army, including the Army Chief of Staff (Oct 9, 2000 – June 4, 2002), the Army Deputy Chief of Staff and Commander of Indonesia Military School of Commander. Previously he also served as operation assistant to army's chief of general staff at the TNI Headquarters. When former president Suharto stepped down on May 21, Endriartono was his commander of presidential guard.

Personal life 
His parents were Sutarto and Siti Sumarti Sutarto. Endriartono has three children, one daughter named Ratri Indrihapsari and two sons, Indra Gunawan Sutarto and M. Adi Prasantyo Sutarto, from his marriage with Andy Widayati.

Military career 
Endriartono's military career soared during the administration of former president Abdurrahman “Gus Dur” Wahid until October 9, when the president installed him as Army Chief (KASAD) replacing Gen. Tyasno Sudarto.

Apart from his seasoned military knowledge, Endriartono who speaks fluent English has completed his undergraduate degree from Military Law School (STHM) in Jakarta.
 
Endriartono has also taken a wide range of military courses while climbed up to top posts in the military, among others Sussarcab Infanteri (Infantry Basic Branch/Corps Course), Suslapa I Infanteri (Infantry Officer Advanced Course), Army School for Commanders (SESKOAD), Armed Forces Commanders’ School (SESKO ABRI) and National Resilience Institute (Lemhanas). Besides, he also furthered his education to develop his specialty including Susjurpa Course, English Course, Air Borne, Ranger, Path Finder Course, Combat Instructor Course and Infantry Battalion Commander Course.

He attained military top post when former president Megawati Soekarnoputri appointed him TNI chief on June 2, 2002. The country's history recorded him as the 12th Indonesian Military Chief. 
 
The downfall of New Order and the birth of Reform era in 1998 have somehow served as a turning point for the Indonesian Military history. The TNI began its grueling job to reform its task, function and role in the newly exercised democracy by focusing on defense and security aspect and staying away from political arena. With pressures and the call of the era, TNI must be sterile from politics unlike in the past when military owned dual function in defense and security as well as in politics. History has it that TNI was an integral part of the New Order regime because the TNI, especially the army, was deemed as Suharto's golden child. The latter was a five-star army general.

However, commitments shown from top down, TNI brass to its soldiers, have gradually won the public's trust. The neutrality of the military was put on a test when the country had its first-ever direct election in 2004 as politicians and political parties attempted to draw military into political arena, yet again. Under the leadership of then Gen. Endriartono Sutarto, the forces strongly opposed the attempts. Firmly and consistently Endriartono prevented political hands to infiltrate into the institution. The 2004 elections was a success and dubbed the most democratic elections the country ever had. Retired military general, Susilo Bambang Yudhoyono was elected president and TNI remained keeping its distance from political practices. Endriartono has demonstrated his true patriotic call and played crucial role in keeping TNI neutrality in the 2004 general elections.

During his tenure, there were several major cases that involved TNI and security-defense policies in Indonesia. An instance of point in case was the making of the Aceh peace agreement that was achieved after a long diplomatic negotiation process in Helsinki, Finland. Endriartono, as TNI chief then, became a deciding factor in the success of Aceh peace agreement and its implementation in the westernmost province where Free Aceh Movement had been in war with the military. In the wake of tsunami that hit the province in 2004, doors were opened for both warring parties to agree on making peace.

For his commandable role and integrity in keeping TNI neutrality, advancing tsunami humanitarian operations instead of military operation in Aceh, maintaining peace during its critical times, and dedication to the country, on Nov 10, 2008 Modernisator recognized Endriartono and awarded him "Present Day Hero".

Other achievement that Endriartono made during his tenure as TNI chief was when he decided to place and rank all forces in purely equal linear position. The Army, the Navy and Air Forces were equal in so many ways.

Endriartono broke the old tradition in the military that the Army was perceived to be more dominant than other forces. And he made the change of tradition systematically, clearly and firmly. Certain posts usually assumed by army officers were hauled by balancing the structures and used merit-based appraisal to promote officers regardless of their forces.

Endriartono who was a high-ranking army officer announced that he deeply respected other forces; the Navy and the Air Forces. Under his leadership, officers from the Air Forces could begin assuming posts like Logistics Assistant Chief at the TNI Headquarters and even become chief of general staff, a post that had been traditionally, for decades, became a regular one for Army officer. 
 
Likewise, the post of General Secretary at the Defense Ministry was for the first time assigned to an Air Force officer. Three-star-generals at the TNI Headquarters used to be dominated by the Army were restructured into three positions dedicated respectively for the Army, the Navy and the Air Forces. Endriartono tendered his post to a successor from the Air Forces.

Military highlights 
These are a few positions were held by Endriartono:
 Graduated from Indonesian Armed Forces Academy (1971)
 Platoon Chief A/305 Kostrad (1972–1975)
 Banki B/328 Kostrad (1976)
 Kostrad Kompi commander (1975–1979)
 Operation Chief of Infantry Battalion (Kasiops Yonif) Kostrad (1979–1981)
 Chief of Operation at 330 Kostrad (1980)
 Lecturer at Indonesian Military School for Officer Candidates (Secapa AD) (1982–1984)
 Commander of Infantry Battalion (Danyonif) 514 Kostrad (1985–1987)
 Chief of Garuda IX (1988–1989)
 Chief of staff of Infantry Air Borne Brigade (Kasbrigif Linud) 17/1 Kostrad (1989–1991)
 Assistant to Operation Chief of Jakarta Military Command (1993–1994)
 Military Resort Commander 173 Dam-VIII/Trikora (1994–1995)
 Chief of staff of Infantry Division (Kas Divif) 1 Kostrad (1995–1996)
 Deputy Assistant of General Planning to TNI Chief (Waasrenum Pangab) (1996)
 Deputy operation assistant to the Army Chief of Staff (Waasops Kasad) (1996–1997)
 Commander of Presidential Guard (Paspampres) (1997–1998)
 Assistant to Chief of General Staff (Asops Kasum) ABRI (1998–1999)
 Commander of School for TNI Commanders (Sesko TNI) (1999–2000)
 Deputy Army Chief of Staff  (WAKASAD) (2000)
 Army Chief of Staff  (KASAD) (2000)
 Indonesia Military Commander  (2002–2006)

Post military career 

After resigning from military, Endriartono Sutarto continues his activities in a number of organizations. His passion for activism and organization was shown in his tender age when he chaired student organization at his school, public high school SMAN 2 Bandung from 1966 to 1967.

In September 2010, Endriartono was on advisory board for KPK (Commission for Corruption Eradication) defense team. His involvement in the board defending KPK had stirred speculations that there were “invisible powerful hands” were behind the attempts to criminalize KPK leaders then, Bibit Samad Riyanto and Chandra M. Hamzah. “I don’t want to speculate. But if that’s the case, with me in the board (Bibit-Chandra defense team), the ‘invisible powerful hands’ must think twice to continue whatever they intend to do,” Endriarto once said.

From 2010 Endriartono has been active as the executive chairman for 7 Summits Expedition Wanadri and also become an advisor for Indonesia Mengajar Movement. Tireless, Endriartono is also advisor for Indonesia Setara Foundation.

His experience in leading the armed forces of the world’s fourth most populously country with thousands of ethnic groups and competence in handling conflicts have earned recognition for Endriartono, not only at home but also overseas. He was invited by Military Dialog Center to help seeking resolution for the Myanmar conflict.

Political career 
Endriartono began his involvement in political practices in September 2012. Some suspect that Endriartono’s move to political stage is part of his plan to race in the 2014 presidential election. Endriartono formally joined in the National Democratic (Nasdem) Party in September 30, 2012.  During an interview at the popular talk show Mata Najwa aired by Metro TV, Endriartono said he had not yet joined in Nasdem Party but he was part of its mass organization. He officially began his political career as a member of Nasdem Party’s advisory council and has been rumored as strongest candidate to take the highest helm as the party chairman on the party’s upcoming national congress scheduled to be held at the end of January 2013.

Endriartono’s decision to join Nasdem Party has raised questions to many quarters. However, Endriartono stressed that he only had one reason that was to make a change. “It takes power to be able to make a change, without power we cannot do anything. That how the (political) system works here. To get the power we must win the election, if not the presidential post, at least we can get a hold of the House of Representatives (DPR) so we can create pro-people policies,” he said.

In recent survey on the 2014 presidential election by LSI (Lingkar Survei Indonesia) Endriartono was enlisted as one of alternative candidates to be Indonesia President based on five categories as follow:

 Able to lead the country and the administration
 Does not commit or is opinionated to commit corruption practices or bribery
 Does not commit or is opinionated to commit crime or human right abuse
 Honest, trustable, or can be trusted 
 Able to stand above all groups or interests

The rank based on LSI survey is as follows:

 Mahfud MD 79
 Jusuf Kalla 77
 Dahlan Iskan 76
 Sri Mulyani 72
 Hidayat Nurwahid 71
 Agus Martowardojo 68
 Megawati Soekarnoputri 68
 Djoko Suyanto 67
 Gita Wirjawan 66
 Chairul Tanjung 66
 Endriartono Sutarto 66
 Hatta Rajasa 66
 Surya Paloh 64
 Pramono Edhie Wibowo 64
 Sukarwo 63
 Prabowo Subianto 61
 Puan Maharani 61
 Ani Yudhoyono 60

In this LSI survey Endriartono is ranked 11th with a total score of 66. Commenting on the survey result, Endriartono said,” I thank all respondents (of the survey). It is definitely a challenge to realize those expectations,".

On January 25, 2013, National Democratic Party organized a congress during which cofounder Surya Paloh was unanimously elected party chairman to serve 2012–2017 term. The congress also mandated Surya Paloh, as elected chairman, to compose a new line up of party executives, aimed at winning the legislative election in 2014. On February 8, Surya Paloh announced the new composition of Nasdem Party executive that included Endriartono Sutarto as chairman for its  consultative council.

Controversies 
Endriartono Sutarto's decision to tender his post as TNI chief before his tenure completed came as a surprise for many. In October 2004 TNI Headquarters in Cilangkap confirmed the resignation and cited three conditions that Endriartono requested. TNI said in the letter submitted to then president Megawati Soekarnoputri Endriarto cited first the need for reorganization significance inside TNI, age factor (Endriartono's retirement had been extended for two years), and a successor from one of his chief of staffs.

After he retired, Endriartono took up a commissioner position at state oil company Pertamina but it did not last long because Endriartono resigned shortly. Circulating informations say it was discomforting for Endriartono to receive a huge amount of monthly salary from the company while he did not do much to earn it.

"I resigned my position in Pertamina because I saw how Pertamina did not deliver its best service to the public. Although it is a profit-oriented company but it did not mean that it solely seek profits since it manages natural resources that are strategic for public needs," said Endriartono.

Air Force Marshall (Ret) Chappy Hakim believed that the decision must be made because Endriartono's principals and values that he clinged to collided with what he found inside the company once known as one of the most corrupt state enterprises.

External links 
  Endriartono Sutarto Official Site
  Biography of Endriartono Sutarto
  Endriartono Sutarto at Modernisator Indonesia

Notes 

|-
 

1947 births
Living people
Indonesian Muslims
People from Purworejo Regency
Indonesian generals
Chiefs of Staff of the Indonesian Army
Commanders of the Indonesian National Armed Forces